Mashtots Hayrapet (also Pok'r meaning "Little") is a church located within the village of Garni in the Kotayk Province of Armenia. It was built in the 12th century at the site of what was a pagan shrine. A stone carved from red tufa is situated at the right of the entrance upon a low rock wall. It has on it the design of a bird perched on a floral stem with the rosette of eternity under its tail. The rosette is also a distinctive pagan symbol representing the sun or the moon, symbolizing the eternal cycle of life, death, and rebirth. It is said that because of this pagan symbology, this stone has a connection to the prior shrine.

The church has a small cruciform type central-plan with a single drum and dome. It is constructed from dark grey stone, with red tufa inlaid around the windows, roof, and dome. Elaborate decorations of geometric and foliage patterns may be seen all around the windows, portal, dome, and other parts of the façade. The apron around the apse in the interior of the church also is intricately carved. A number of khachkars are scattered around the church grounds, including one in particular adjacent to the building that is reminiscent of a small shrine.

In the village is also the fortress complex of Garni with the 1st century AD Garni Temple, Surb Astvatsatsin Church, a ruined 4th century single-aisle church, a ruined Tukh Manuk Shrine, Saint Sargis Shrine, and a Queen Katranide Shrine. Across the Garni Gorge is the Havuts Tar Monastery and Aghjots Vank located in the Khosrov State Reserve.

Gallery

References

Bibliography

External links 

 Places to See: Garni
 Mashtots Hayrapet Church of Garni on Panoramio: photo1, photo2, photo3, Cross-Stone, Tombstone

Armenian Apostolic churches in Armenia
Tourist attractions in Kotayk Province
Buildings and structures in Kotayk Province
12th-century Oriental Orthodox church buildings
12th-century churches in Armenia